Super V is an Indian animated television series loosely based on Virat Kohli and was created by Harman Baweja for Star India. It was launched on multiple Star Network and Disney India's channels from 5 November 2019.

Plot 
Super V is the story of Virat. A teenager at the cusp of childhood and adulthood. An impulsive boy, who is trying to find his identity between his aspirations, his father's expectations and other pressures. What happens when a boy like this, becomes a superhero?

15 year old Virat lives with his parents and Sister in New Delhi. His father, Ashok is a lawyer, someone infamous for his strict honesty, and his mother, Gogi is a homemaker, a supermom, who always manages to ground the situation no matter how volatile it gets. The reason? Well the same reason that disturbs the situation in every house, the relationship between Virat and Ashok. Ashok wants Virat to be more responsible and Virat wants to be himself. Ashok wants Virat to be more disciplined and Virat wants to be left alone. Ashok wants Virat to be more mature and well, Virat wants to stay a teenager for a few more years.

There are a few more things Virat wants, one to become the best batsman in the whole world. He idolizes Sachit Wadekar and wants to be as good as him. The boy is a prodigy. His coach, teacher, even his father, knows that Virat is meant to shine in the field of cricket and the only thing that stops him from shining is his anger.
The other thing that causes problems in his dream to become a great cricketer, is the school baddie, the school bully, Sooraj, who is the reigning captain of the under 19 Indian team. Virat nemesis, Sooraj is a very good bowler. He tries his level best to create problems for Virat while playing cricket. What makes it easy for him is that he comes from a rich, influential background.

Virat is the kind of a guy who doesn't talk to everyone, but with the few that he talks to, he talks non-stop. And three such people are. Jo, Bunny, and Amara. His best friends. They stick with him through thick and thin. And of course, there is also Shazia, Virat's crush. Virat is tongue-tied whenever she is around.

His journey to become a superhero starts when his grandfather comes in his dream on his 15th birthday and tells him that his family has a secret. They are a family of superheroes! As he inherits his family's heirloom, he realizes that he can use these powers of the kada (the bracelet) for good. But the rule of the universe is that if there is good then there must be evil. As the Superhero rises, so does a Supervillain. Navar, the supervillain of the story has a plan to take over the world.

An intertwining story of how Virat must balance his life at home, with his friends, his love interest, saving the world from Navar's evil plans and must still find it within himself to make India win the world cup!

Cast 
 Upen Chauhan as Virat / Super V (Voice-over by Vaibhav Thakkar)
Samay Raj Thakkar as Nawaal
Anil Dutt as Virat's Grandfather
 Rishabh Arora as Bunny 
Mallika Singh as Amara / Shazia
Nathan Dcosta as Jo (English) 
Ketan Kava as Jo (Hindi)
Akash Chopra (Cameo) as the commentator

Episodes

Release 
The series premiered simultaneously on 5 November 2019 across five Star India owned networks - Disney Channel India, Marvel HQ, Star Sports and Star Plus as well as streaming service Hotstar. In North America it was streamed exclusively on Hotstar USA, and in the United Kingdom the series was aired on Star Plus UK. The series is dubbed into Bengali and broadcast on Star Jalsha.

References

External links 

 

2019 Indian television series debuts
Indian children's animated action television series
Indian children's animated comedy television series
Indian children's animated superhero television series
Disney Channel (Indian TV channel) original programming
StarPlus original programming
Hindi-language Disney+ Hotstar original programming